Gustavo Peña Velasco (22 November 1942 – 19 January 2021) was a Mexican professional footballer and manager.

Life
Born in Talpa de Allende, Peña moved to Guadalajara, Jalisco, Mexico, with his parents when he was young.

Gustavo Peña died of COVID-19 in Mexico City on 19 January 2021, at age 78, during the COVID-19 pandemic in Mexico.

Career
He began playing football with local side CD Oro. He played for nearly twenty years in the Primera División with Oro, Cruz Azul, Monterrey and Club de Fútbol Laguna.

He earned 82 caps and scored 3 goals for the Selección de fútbol de México (Mexico national team) from 1961 to 1974, and captained the team in FIFA World Cup (1966 and 1970) tournaments.

International goals
Scores and results list Mexico's goal tally first.

Honours

Manager
Leones Negros
CONCACAF Champions' Cup: 1978

References

External links

1942 births
2021 deaths
Mexican footballers
Mexico international footballers
1966 FIFA World Cup players
1970 FIFA World Cup players
Cruz Azul footballers
C.F. Monterrey players
Mexican football managers
Mexico national football team managers
C.F. Monterrey managers
Liga MX players
Association football defenders
Deaths from the COVID-19 pandemic in Mexico